Kaave Lajevardi is an Iranian philosopher. He is known for translating classic philosophy books into Persian.
Lajevardi was a faculty member of Institute for Research in Fundamental Sciences (2008-2012).
He has published some papers on academic dishonesty in Iranian universities.

Translations
 Naming and Necessity, Saul Kripke, Tehran: Hermes
 Wittgenstein on Rules and Private Language, Saul Kripke, Tehran: Markaz
 An Enquiry Concerning Human Understanding, David Hume, Tehran: Markaz
 A Primer of Real Functions, Ralph P. Boas Jr., Tehran: Elmi Farhangi
 A Dialogue on Personal Identity and Immortality, John Perry, Tehran: Markaz

References

External links
 
Lajevardi at PhilPapers

21st-century Iranian philosophers
Analytic philosophers
Philosophy academics
University of Toronto alumni
University of Tehran alumni
Academic staff of the Institute for Research in Fundamental Sciences
Living people
1971 births
Sharif University of Technology alumni
English–Persian translators
Iranian logicians